Mervyn Richard Wingfield, 8th Viscount Powerscourt  (16 July 1880 – 21 March 1947) was an Irish peer.

Life
Wingfield was born to Mervyn Wingfield, 7th Viscount Powerscourt, whom he succeeded as Viscount Powerscourt in 1904.

He was commissioned in the Irish Guards in February 1901, and promoted to Lieutenant on 3 July 1901. The Irish Guards had been created in 1900, and Wingfield was chosen to carry the colours at the first presentation of Colours to the Regiment on 30 May 1902, following which he was appointed a Member of the Royal Victorian Order (MVO). He was appointed Lord Lieutenant of Wicklow on 15 February 1910 and created a Knight of the Order of St Patrick on 18 April 1916.

Lord Powerscourt died on 21 March 1947.

Family
In 1903, he married Sybil Pleydell-Bouverie: they had three children, including Mervyn Patrick Wingfield, 9th Viscount Powerscourt. Lady Powerscourt served as the Girl Guides Deputy Chief Commissioner for Ireland.

Through the Wingfield line he was a descendant of the Noble House of Stratford. He is a great-grandfather of Sarah, Duchess of York through her mother Susan Barrantes, who is Powerscourt's granddaughter.

References

External links
 

Mervyn
1880 births
1947 deaths
Knights of St Patrick
Lord-Lieutenants of Wicklow
Members of the Royal Victorian Order
Viscounts in the Peerage of Ireland
Members of the Senate of Southern Ireland